The America's Cup Hall of Fame, located at the Herreshoff Marine Museum of Bristol, Rhode Island, USA, honors individuals for outstanding achievement in the  America's Cup sailing competition.  Candidates eligible for consideration include skippers, afterguard, crew, designers, builders, organizers, syndicate managers, supporters, chroniclers, race managers, and other individuals of merit.  A selection committee of twenty-two members consisting of former America's Cup participants, yachting historians, and yachting journalists annually selects a class of one to four inductees.  Rolex, Louis Vuitton, and Prada have been sponsors of the Hall of Fame's induction ceremonies.

The Hall of Fame's museum, a division of the Herreshoff Marine Museum, features plaques of the inductees and permanent and temporary exhibitions of artifacts related to the America's Cup. The museum's library contains one of the largest collections of manuscripts and books related to the America's Cup and yachting history.

History
Halsey C. Herreshoff, former president of the Herreshoff Marine Museum and three-time America's Cup winner, founded the Hall of Fame in 1992. In the following year, on September 18, eighteen "charter" inductees were honored at the Herreshoff Marine Museum.  Since then, over ninety inductees have joined the Hall of Fame.

List of Inductees

1993–1999

1993
Charles Francis Adams III
Charlie Barr
Robert N. Bavier, Jr.
John Bertrand
Dennis Conner
Briggs S. Cunningham
William P. Ficker
Nathanael Herreshoff
Ted Hood
William I. Koch
Sir Thomas J. Lipton
Emil "Bus" Mosbacher
George L. Schuyler
Olin J. Stephens II
Roderick Stephens, Jr.
Ted Turner
Gertrude Vanderbilt
Harold S. Vanderbilt

1994
Edward Burgess
W. Starling Burgess
Sir James Hardy
Sherman Hoyt
C. Oliver Iselin
Victor A. Romagna
John Cox Stevens

1995
Arthur Knapp, Jr.
Morris Rosenfeld
Henry Sears
T.O.M. Sopwith
George Lennox Watson

1996
Sir Peter Blake
Russell Coutts
Chandler Hovey
Frank J. Murdoch
Gen. Charles J. Paine

1997
James Lloyd Ashbury
William F. Carstens
Charles E. Nicholson

1998
J. Burr Bartram
Baron Marcel Bich
George Steers

1999
 Captain Richard Brown
James Buttersworth
Sir Frank Packer

2000–2009

2000
Edward I. du Moulin
Edwin D. Morgan
Tom Schnackenberg

2001
Thomas Egerton, 2nd Earl of Wilton
Harry "Buddy" Melges, Jr.
Henry Sturgis Morgan

2002
Malin Burnham
Sir Michael Fay
Stanley Rosenfeld

2003
Alan Bond
Gary Jobson

2004
Brad Butterworth
William Fife III
Henry Coleman Haff
Thomas A. Whidden

2005
George "Fritz" Jewett Jr.
Alan Payne
Jack Sutphen

2006
Ben Lexcen
Stephen A. Van Dyck

2007
Laurie Davidson
Bruno Troublé

2008
John Biddle

2009
John Longley AM
Thomas Ratsey

2010–2019
2010
Halsey C. Herreshoff
Simon Daubney
Warwick Fleury
Murray Jones
Dean Phipps
Mike Drummond
2012
Patrizio Bertelli
Gerard B. Lambert, Sr.
Jonathan Wright
2013
Grant Simmer
Noel Robins
Lucy M. Jewett
2016
Windham Thomas Wyndham-Quin, 4th Earl of Dunraven and Mount-Earl
Ernesto Bertarelli
2017
John Marshall
Doug Peterson
Syd Fischer
2018
Ken McAlpine
2019
Henry Racamier
William H. Dyer Jones
William T. Trenkle

2020–present
2020
Franklin Osgood
Bryan Wills
Rolf Vrolijk

2021
Ed Baird
Peter Montgomery (broadcaster)

See also
America's Cup
Louis Vuitton Cup

References

External links
America's Cup Hall of Fame webpage. Herreshoff Marine Museum website.
Visitor Information webpage. Herreshoff Marine Museum website.
Herreshoff Marine Museum website

Awards established in 1992
Halls of fame in Rhode Island
Hall of Fame